The Composers Association of New Zealand (CANZ), established in 1974, after an initial meeting of composers was organised by David Farquhar. Farquhar was the association's first president. It is a body that lobbies for the interests of New Zealand composers.

Through its affiliations with the International Society for Contemporary Music (ISCM) and the Asian Composers League, CANZ provides its members with opportunities to participate in international music festivals as well as other opportunities. The organisation's flagship event is the annual CANZ Nelson Composers Workshop, a four-day gathering of New Zealand's emerging composers. CANZ members receive the yearbook, Canzona, and the bi-monthly newsletter, Canzonetta.

The association presents two prizes annually: the KBB Citation for Services to New Zealand Music and the CANZ Trust Fund Award which recognises current compositional achievement.

Award recipients

KBB Citation for Services to New Zealand Music

 1976 Alex Lindsay (posthumous)
 1977 Peter Godfrey
 1979 Owen Jensen
 1980 Thomas Vernon Griffiths
 1981 Frederick Page
 1982 Ashley Heenan
 1983 Larry Pruden (posthumous)
 1984 David Farquhar
 1985 Jack Body
 1986 Tony Vercoe
 1987 Margaret Neilsen
 1988 John Thomson
 1989 Philip Norman
 1990 Ross Harris
 1991 William Dart
 1992 John Ritchie
 1993 William Southgate
 1994 John Rimmer
 1995 Nan Anderson
 1996 John Hopkins
 1997 Auckland Philharmonia
 1998 Jack Speirs
 1999 Dorothy Freed
 2000 Dorothea Franchi
 2001 Richard Nunns
 2002 Waiteata Music Press
 2003 175 East
 2004 Scilla Askew
 2005 John Cousins
 2006 Karen Grylls
 2007 Gillian Whitehead
 2008 Jenny McLeod
 2009 Andrew Uren
 2010 Chris Cree Brown
 2011 Allan Thomas
 2012 NZTrio
 2013 Gretchen LaRoche
 2014 John Elmsly
 2015 Stephen De Pledge
 2016 Stroma
 2017 Peter Scholes
 2018 Mark Menzies
 2019 Audio Foundation

Composers Association New Zealand Trust Fund award

 1985 Philip Dadson
 1986 Chris Cree Brown
 1987 Dorothy Buchanan
 1988 David Hamilton
 1989 Eric Biddington
 1990 Kenneth Young
 1991 Leonie Holmes
 1992 Not awarded
 1993 John Young
 1994 Neville Hall
 1995 Maria Grenfell
 1996 John Psathas
 1997 Helen Bowater
 1998 Anthony Ritchie
 1999 Philip Brownlee
 2000 Eve de Castro-Robinson
 2001 Rachel Clement
 2002 Penny Axtens
 2003 James Gardner
 2004 Chris Watson
 2005 Dylan Lardelli
 2006 Samuel Holloway
 2007 Patrick Shepherd
 2008 Gareth Farr
 2009 Robin Toan
 2010 Gao Ping
 2011 Michael Norris
 2012 Louise Webster
 2013 Alex Taylor
 2014 Chris Gendall
 2015 Dorothy Ker
 2016 Ross Harris
 2017 Celeste Oram
 2018 Lyell Cresswell
 2019 Reuben Jelleyman

References

External links 
 http://www.canz.net.nz
 Composers' Association of New Zealand archival records at the Alexander Turnbull Library

Music organisations based in New Zealand